Arjaq (also known as Archaq and Arjagh) is a village in Qarah Su Rural District, Meshgin-e Sharqi District, Meshgin Shahr County, Ardabil Province, Iran. At the 2006 census, its population was 573, in 170 families.

The 14th-century author Hamdallah Mustawfi mentioned it in his Nuzhat al-Qulub, as Arjāq, as one of the seven cities in the tuman of Pishkin. He claimed that it had been founded by the Sasanian king Qubād after his father Fīrūz had founded the nearby city of Anād. He described both cities as having temperate climates, being watered by streams coming down from Mount Sabalan, and having rich gardens that produced fruits, grapes, melons, and nuts abundantly. The two were collectively assessed at a tax revenue of 7,000 dinars.

References 

Tageo

Towns and villages in Meshgin Shahr County